Christian Springs is an unincorporated community in Upper Nazareth Township, Pennsylvania. It is located between the boroughs of Bath and Narareth at the junction of Pennsylvania State Routes 248 and 946.  It is part of the Lehigh Valley metropolitan area, which had a population of 861,899 and was the 68th most populated metropolitan area in the U.S. as of the 2020 census.

Christian Springs is drained by the Monocacy Creek southward into the Lehigh River. Italcementi Group operates a cement facility in Christian Springs, which is a remnant of the Lehigh Valley's once-burgeoning cement industry. 

The village is served by the Nazareth post office, which uses the ZIP Code 18064.

Unincorporated communities in Northampton County, Pennsylvania
Unincorporated communities in Pennsylvania